Pillai may refer to: 
Pillai (Kerala title), a title of nobility used by Nairs of Kerala.
Pillai of Pallichal, a title of the order of nobility in Travancore.
Pillai (surname), a title of nobility used by certain people in Tamil Nadu, Kerala, and Sri Lanka
Pilai, a Finnish bagpipe.